Popular Mechanics for Kids (sometimes abbreviated to PMK) is a Canadian educational television program based on Popular Mechanics magazine. The program aired on Global TV from 1997 until 2000. It was notable for starting the careers of Elisha Cuthbert, Jay Baruchel, Tyler Kyte, and Vanessa Lengies. Along with Elisha Cuthbert, Vanessa Lengies, and Jay Baruchel, the original cast included Charles Powell, nicknamed "Charlie" for the program. Beginning in season 2, Tyler Kyte joins the cast of the program.

Overview
The program starts off with an overview of the episode. The hosts (Elisha, Tyler, Jay, and later Vanessa) then start their adventures on the show (amusement park, snowboarding, surfing, visiting a science museum, etc.) Throughout the adventures, short, educational segments are shown. The program's intent was to teach viewers how things work.

In the segment "Charlie's Experiment / Tip", host Charlie, and sometimes the other hosts, demonstrate an experiment. He sometimes answers frequently asked questions about related science topics. At the start of season 3, one of the hosts (normally Vanessa) would go on a third adventure. The show then comes to a close, with the co-hosts saying "See you next week!".

There have been four VHS videos called "How Do They Build?", hosted by a boy named Mike and a miniaturized man named Pop.

Segments

 Maniac Brainiac
 Cool Tool
 Charlie's Experiment/Tip
 Mechanix with Nix and Tix, later known as just Nix & Tix
 Action!
 Coming Up on PMK
 Rewind 
 Fast Forward
 FACTory
 Under the Hood
 Gear Gutz
 Sparks
 System Error
 eXtreme

Episodes

Cast

 Elisha Cuthbert
 Jay Baruchel
 Tyler Kyte
 Vanessa Lengies 
 Charles Powell

Honours
It was awarded the Parents Choice Award in 2003, and was nominated for the Gemini Awards.

Production
The show was filmed primarily in Montreal, Quebec. The show was produced by the Global Television Network in Canada, Hearst Entertainment in the U.S., and finally TVA International in Canada for the final episodes in 2000.

Telecast and home media
The show aired in syndication in the U.S. (including Hearst-owned television stations), before moving to moving to Discovery Kids on Saturday mornings by the program's final season in 2000. Repeats of the show continued to air on many channels until 2008. It was tested on BBC Kids and Discovery Kids in Canada until December 31, 2009. After the closure of Discovery Kids in Canada, BBC Kids stopped airing repeats in all countries (except Canada). The repeats on BBC Kids in Canada ended on May 14, 2011.  repeats of the show continue to air on Knowledge Network. In the U.S., the show can currently be streamed on Tubi and The Roku Channel.

A number of VHS copies (and later, DVDs) have been released by Koch Vision and E1 Entertainment.
 Slither and Slime and Other Yucky Things
 Radical Rockets and Other Cool Cruising Machines
 Rip Roaring Rollercoasters and All Access to Fun
 Gators, Dragons and Other Wild Beasts
 Super Sea Creatures and Awesome Ocean Adventures
 Lightning and Other Forces of Nature
 X-Treme Rides
 Roller Coasters
 Firefighters and Other Lifesaving Heroes
 Zoos
 Garbage
 Popular Mechanics For Kids: 4 DVD Box Set
 Popular Mechanics For Kids: 6 DVD Box Set
 Popular Mechanics For Kids: The Complete First Season
 Popular Mechanics For Kids: The Complete Second Season
 Popular Mechanics For Kids: The Complete Third Season
 Popular Mechanics For Kids: The Complete Fourth Season
 How Do They Build Bridges
 How Do They Build Skyscrapers
 How Do They Build Tunnels
 How Do They Build Spaceships

References

External links 
 
 

1997 Canadian television series debuts
2000 Canadian television series endings
Canadian children's education television series
Television shows filmed in Montreal
First-run syndicated television programs in the United States
Television shows based on magazines
Science education television series
Global Television Network original programming
1990s Canadian children's television series
2000s Canadian children's television series
Television series about teenagers
Television series by Entertainment One
Television series by Corus Entertainment
Canadian children's reality television series
English-language television shows